Michele Anne Mitchell (born January 10, 1962, in Phoenix, Arizona) is a former diver from the United States. She is a two-time Olympic medalist on the 10-meter platform, winning silver in 1984 and 1988. In 1988 she was inducted into the University of Arizona Athletic Hall of Fame and the International Swimming Hall of Fame in 1995. Formerly the longtime diving coach at UA, she is the director of operations for the swimming and diving teams.

A four-time All-American at Arizona, Mitchell's accomplishments also include 1986 Sullivan Award nominee, 1989 Lawrence J. Johnson Award, 2009 Phil Boggs Award, nine-time U.S. national champion, 1985 World FINA Cup champion, 1987 Pan American Games champion, four-time U.S. Olympic Committee Athlete of the Year honoree, and American record holder for platform diving, 479.40 points for an eight-dive list.

Mitchell is also the most decorated diver in Arizona history. She serves the sport today by holding notable roles in the collegiate and world diving communities, including chair, NCAA Swimming and Diving Rules Committee, and chair, USA Diving, Committee for Competitive Excellence and Head Diving Coach, University of Arizona.

Mitchell has also shared her knowledge of the sport through television. Her television resume includes the 1992 Olympic Trials and Games, the 1994 and 1995 NCAA Women's Championships, and the 1993 World University Games. During the summer of 1996, she anchored the in-stadium radio broadcasts for diving at the Olympic Games in Atlanta and was the bungee jump analyst for the ESPN X-Games.

Education
Mitchell earned a bachelor's degree in English in 1983, with a minor in athletic coaching and secondary education. She received her master's degree in sports administration in December 2000 and a doctorate in education psychology in May 2007, all from the University of Arizona.

See also
 List of members of the International Swimming Hall of Fame

References

External links
 Arizona Wildcats.com - Swimming & Diving - Dr. Michele Mitchell
 
 tucsondivingteam.com

1962 births
Living people
Divers at the 1984 Summer Olympics
Divers at the 1988 Summer Olympics
Olympic silver medalists for the United States in diving
Sportspeople from Phoenix, Arizona
Arizona Wildcats women's divers
American female divers
Medalists at the 1988 Summer Olympics
Medalists at the 1984 Summer Olympics
Pan American Games gold medalists for the United States
Pan American Games medalists in diving
Universiade medalists in diving
Divers at the 1987 Pan American Games
Universiade silver medalists for the United States
Medalists at the 1985 Summer Universiade
Medalists at the 1987 Pan American Games